The 2020 Lamborghini Super Trofeo Europe is the twelfth season. The calendar consists of five rounds. Every event features two 50 Minute races. 2020 marks the 2nd season of the Lamborghini Huracán Super Trofeo Evo. There can be two drivers or one driver per car. A car is entered in one of four categories: Pro, Pro-Am, Am and Lamborghini Cup (LC)

Calendar

Entry List

Race Results
Bold indicates the overall winner.

References

Lamborghini Super Trofeo seasons